Staroyantuzovo (İśke Yandıź) is a rural locality (a selo) and the administrative centre of Staroyantuzovsky Selsoviet, Dyurtyulinsky District, Bashkortostan, Russia. The population was 586 as of 2010. There are 11 streets.

Geography 
Staroyantuzovo is located 20 km southeast of Dyurtyuli (the district's administrative centre) by road. Kaishevo is the nearest rural locality.

References 

Rural localities in Dyurtyulinsky District